Hubertus Antonius van der Aa (5 July 1935, in Tilburg7 May 2017) was a Dutch mycologist who described several genera and species of fungi. He studied at Utrecht University where he received his PhD in 1973 with the dissertation 	Studies in phyllosticta I.

Publications

References

1935 births
2017 deaths
Dutch mycologists
People from Tilburg
Utrecht University alumni